Sidney John Orton (1890–1978) was an English greyhound trainer. He was the trainer of Mick the Miller and a UK leading trainer during the 1930s.

Profile
Sidney was born in Aylsham, Norfolk and helped his parents run the family farm in Stonegate. He married Gladys Harmer in 1917 and had a family including a son called Sydney 'Clare' Orton in 1918. When oval circuit greyhound racing arrived in Britain in 1926, he swapped his interest in coursing to become Clerk of the Scales and then a trainer during the early years at Wimbledon Stadium.

The family lived in the Wimbledon trainers complex known as Burhill Kennels in Hersham, Walton-on-Thames. In December 1929, he was propelled to national fame when he took charge of Mick the Miller and won the 1930 English Greyhound Derby.

During the 1930s, he won a significant number of classic races and was one of the leading trainers in the country. He earned the nickname 'The Wizard of Burhill'. He handled the famous greyhounds including Ballynennan Moon, Brilliant Bob, Ballyhennessy Sandhills, Quare Times, Mondays News and Burhill Moon before retiring in 1959.

His son, Clare, took up training in the late 1940s initially at Coventry and Clapton before taking over the Wimbledon contract when his father retired. 

He died on late 1978, aged 88.

References 

1890 births
1978 deaths
British greyhound racing trainers